Aksel Møllers Have station is an underground Copenhagen Metro station located at Aksel Møllers Gave, off Godthåbsvej in the Frederiksberg district of Copenhagen, Denmark. The station is on the City Circle Line  (M3), between Frederiksberg Station and Nuuks Plads, and is in fare zone 1.

History
Wire work and archeological excavations began medio 2010. The station was opened on 29 September 2019 together with 16 other stations of the line.

Service

References

City Circle Line (Copenhagen Metro) stations
Railway stations opened in 2019
2019 establishments in Denmark
Railway stations in Denmark opened in the 21st century